The Caravelle Hotel is located in Ho Chi Minh City, Vietnam. The hotel was opened to the public on Christmas Eve 1959, when the city was known as Saigon. Contemporary journalists noted its use of Italian marble, bullet-proof glass and a "state-of-the-art air-conditioning system and a Berliet private generator."

The hotel’s modern design was the work of a Vietnamese architect, Mr. Nguyen Van Hoa, a graduate of École Supérieure des Beaux-Arts in Hanoi.

The original ten-story building is now adjoined to a 24-story tower that forms the bulk of the new property. However, the Saigon Saigon Rooftop Bar has changed little since 1959.

Caravelle Hotel is owned by the state-owned Saigon Tourist Co.

History
During the 1960s, the Caravelle was home to the Australian Embassy, the New Zealand Embassy, and the Saigon bureaus of NBC, ABC and CBS. As a hub of communication, it played an important role in the Vietnam War. The Manifesto of the Eighteen became better known as the Caravelle Manifesto after a press conference to announce it was held at the hotel. It also became part of Vietnam fiction and non-fiction literature, such as in Danielle Steele's novel "Message From Nam" and Morley Safer's memoir "Flashbacks". 

On the morning of August 25, 1964, at around 11:30 am, a bomb exploded in room 514, on a floor occupied mostly by foreign journalists, who were all out on assignment. Nine rooms were damaged, windows were blown out of several cars parked in the street, and a number of people were injured without fatalities.

The Australian Embassy was protected by Australian Army soldiers. As part of the draw-down of Australian forces in the country, these became the independent Australian Embassy Guard Platoon, Saigon which was stationed at the Caravelle Hotel from March 1972 until June 1973.

Following the fall of Saigon in 1975, the hotel was taken over and operated by the government and renamed the Doc Lap (Independence) Hotel. This name remained until 1998, when the Caravelle name was relaunched following refurbishment.

When director Phillip Noyce in 2002 surveyed Lam Son Square as a movie set for the dramatic bombing scene in Graham Greene’s The Quiet American, he chose the Caravelle as a stand-in for the historic Hotel Continental across the square. It was not that the Caravelle looked anything like the Continental, but the renovations at the Continental and the cost of shooting scenes at the hotel ruled out the original as an option. As the ground floor of the Caravelle donned stage makeup and a new persona for its acting debut, actors in the movie moved into the Presidential Suites upstairs. Hotel staff remember the actor Michael Caine, who won an Oscar nomination for his portrayal of Thomas Fowler, as an extremely amiable character. Caine would take tea in the bar, chit chat with the restaurant staff, and after discovering that the hotel buffet included roast beef and Yorkshire puddings, became a regular fixture at the restaurant.

References

External links 
Al Jazeera War Hotels Vietnam war journalists' hub: Caravelle Saigon

Hotel buildings completed in 1959
Hotels established in 1959
1950s establishments in South Vietnam
Hotels in Ho Chi Minh City
Skyscraper hotels
Skyscrapers in Ho Chi Minh City